The Matthews Fulling Mill Site is an historic colonial industrial site at North Brookfield, Massachusetts.  It is the location of a fulling mill established by Daniel Mathews c. 1749.  This mill was where Rufus Putnam, the American Revolutionary War officer and early settler of the Ohio Country, was apprenticed to Mathews, who was his brother-in-law. The mill was located on Sucker Brook near the town line with New Braintree.

The site was listed on the National Register of Historic Places in 1975.

See also
National Register of Historic Places listings in Worcester County, Massachusetts

References

Industrial buildings and structures on the National Register of Historic Places in Massachusetts
North Brookfield, Massachusetts
National Register of Historic Places in Worcester County, Massachusetts